Mimogmodera is a genus of longhorn beetles of the subfamily Lamiinae, containing the following species:

 Mimogmodera congoensis (Breuning, 1953)
 Mimogmodera rufula Breuning, 1955
 Mimogmodera truncatipennis Breuning, 1969

References

Desmiphorini